JS Yūdachi (DD-103) is the third ship of Murasame-class destroyers. She was commissioned on 4 March 1999.

Design
The hull design was completely renovated from first-generation DDs. In addition to increasing the size in order to reduce the underwater radiation noise, both superstructure and hull was inclined to reduce the radar cross-section. There is however no angled tripod mainmast like the one of the American  because of the heavy weather of the Sea of Japan in winter. Destroyers built under the First Defense Build-up Plan, including the former , adopted a unique long forecastle style called "Oranda-zaka".

The engine arrangement is COGAG as same as Asagiri class, but a pair of engines are updated to Spey SM1C. And the remaining one pair are replaced by LM2500, same as Kongō class.

Construction and career
Yūdachi was laid down on 18 March 1996 at Sumitomo Heavy Industries Yokosuka as the 1994 plan and launched on 19 August 1997. Commissioned on 4 March 1999, was incorporated into the 6th Escort Corps of the 4th Escort Corps and deployed to Ōminato.

On 6 March 2016, as the 24th dispatched anti-piracy action surface corps, she departed from Ominato base for the Gulf of Aden off the coast of Somalia with the escort ship  and returned to Ominato on 8 September. In addition, on 1 September, on the way back to Japan, a goodwill training was conducted with the Philippine Navy's .

Gallery

Citations

References

 
 Saunders, Stephen. IHS Jane's Fighting Ships 2013-2014. Jane's Information Group (2003). 
 

1997 ships
Murasame-class destroyers (1994)
Ships built by Mitsui Engineering and Shipbuilding